Hans-Rudolf Fitze (* 3 September 1925; † 13 September 1982) was a Swiss footballer who played for nearly his entire football career for FC Basel. He played as defender

Football career
In summer 1947 Fitze moved from his home club FC Birsfelden to FC Basel. Between the years 1947 and 1958 he played a total of 237 games for Basel scoring a total of four goals. 151 of these games were in the Nationalliga A, 24 in the Swiss Cup and 62 were friendly games. He scored one sole goal in the domestic league, two in the Cup and the other goal was scored during the test games.

Fitze played his debut in domestic league game on 12 September 1948 against Young Fellows Zürich in the Hardturm stadium. The game ended in a 3–3 draw. He scored his only domestic league goal for Basel on 6 May 1951 as Basel lost their home game against Cantonal Neuchatel. His biggest success in his career was as Basel won the championship title in Basel's 1952–53 season.

Titles and Honours
 Swiss League Champion: 1952–53

See also
 List of FC Basel players
 List of FC Basel seasons

References

Sources
 Rotblau: Jahrbuch Saison 2017/2018. Publisher: FC Basel Marketing AG. 
 Die ersten 125 Jahre. Publisher: Josef Zindel im Friedrich Reinhardt Verlag, Basel. 
 Verein "Basler Fussballarchiv" Homepage
 1952–53 at RSSSF

FC Basel players
Swiss men's footballers
Association football defenders
1925 births
1982 deaths